Lithurginae is a subfamily of woodborer bees in the family Megachilidae.

Genera
These genera belong to the subfamily Lithurginae:
 Austrothurgus
 Lithurgopsis b (northern cactus woodborers)
 Lithurgus Berthold, 1827 i c g b
 Microthurge Michener, 1983 i c g
 Trichothurgus Moure, 1949 i c g
Data sources: i = ITIS, c = Catalogue of Life, g = GBIF, b = Bugguide.net

References

Further reading

External links

 

Megachilidae